Karl Markovics is an Austrian actor and film director. He was born in Vienna, Austria.

Biography
Markovics' mother worked as a clerk and his father was a bus driver. Markovics did not want to go into a professional career but wanted to become a stage actor, which his parents supported. However, he failed to pass the entry exam for the Max-Reinhardt-Seminar. He did not let this deter him from his dream and began performing at the Serapions Theater in Vienna. In 1987, he started working with the Wiener Ensemble. In 1991, he got his first part in the movie, "Hund und Katz" and in 1993, he played the part of the innkeeper in Paul Harather's tragic-comedy road movie "Indien".

Markovics became known to a wider audience when he played Ernst Stockinger, appearing in the Austrian crime show "Inspector Rex", and then later in the spin-off series "Stockinger". Roles followed with parts in "Hinterholz 8", "Late Show" and – as the main character acting alongside Julia Stemberger - in Geboren in Absurdistan, as well as in "Komm, süßer Tod. Markovics performed in many TV and theater productions, including those at Viennese theaters Theater in der Josefstadt and Wiener Volkstheater, where in 2005 he directed his first play production, The Bald Singer, by Eugène Ionesco.  

Markovics starred as Salomon Sorowitsch in Stefan Ruzowitzky's 2007 film The Counterfeiters, which was awarded the Academy Award for Best Foreign Language Film for that year. Prior to that, his most notable appearances have been in the highly acclaimed Austrian (Viennese) black comedy Komm, süßer Tod (2001), his role as far-right terrorist Franz Fuchs in the 2007 TV film Franz Fuchs - Ein Patriot, and in the police drama television series Inspector Rex. His character from Inspector Rex had his own spin-off series, Stockinger. He also played the role of Ferdinand aus der Fünten in the 2012 Dutch film Süskind, and a small role (Wolf) in the acclaimed 2014 comedy The Grand Budapest Hotel. He also plays a supporting role in the German television series Babylon Berlin.

Markovics remains a frequent stage actor, and in April 2010 played the non-singing role of Samiel in Counterfeiters-director Ruzowitzky's first opera production, Der Freischütz at Vienna's Theater an der Wien. He directed and wrote Atmen in 2011.

Personal life 
Markovics is married to actress Stephanie Taussig. They have two children, Louis and Leonie, and reside in Vienna, Austria.

Selected filmography

External links
 
 Movie Guide and Film Series. New York Times, March 21, 2008. Accessed January 4, 2011.
 Die Fälscher (videorecording) = The counterfeiters. Dayton Metro Library. Accessed January 4, 2011.
  Karl Markovics alias "Samiel" zu Gast bei LUDWIG REITER. Theater an der Wien. Accessed January 4, 2011.

1963 births
Austrian male film actors
Living people
Male actors from Vienna
Austrian film directors
German-language film directors
Austrian male television actors